Blood Relations: Chosen Families in Buffy the Vampire Slayer and Angel is a 2005 academic publication relating to the fictional Buffyverse established by TV series, Buffy and Angel.

Book description

This book looks at the conceptions of family explored in Buffy and Angel. Jes Battis asserts that the series explored nontraditional families that were not necessarily related by blood.

How does "family" relate to concepts of gender, sexuality, power and the supernatural? This book considers such questions. It also examines the "chosen family" as used successfully by programs such as Friends and Sex and the City.

Contents

External links
Phil-books.com - Review of this book
Slayage.tv - Chapter from this book

Books about the Buffyverse
2005 non-fiction books